His Brother's Keeper is a 1921 American silent crime film directed by Wilfrid North and starring Albert L. Barrett, Martha Mansfield and L. Rogers Lytton. It is now considered a lost film.

Cast
 Albert L. Barrett as John Bonham 
 Martha Mansfield as Helen Harding 
 L. Rogers Lytton as Rex Radcliffe 
 Frazer Coulter as William Harding 
 Gretchen Hartman as Amalita Cordova 
 Gladden James as Harvey Weer 
 Anne Drew as Mrs. Harvey Weer

References

Bibliography
 John T. Soister, Henry Nicolella & Steve Joyce. American Silent Horror, Science Fiction and Fantasy Feature Films, 1913-1929. McFarland, 2014.

External links

1921 films
1921 crime films
American crime films
Films directed by Wilfrid North
American silent feature films
American black-and-white films
1920s English-language films
1920s American films